GDE or gde may refer to:

Science and technology
 Global Design Effort, a team tasked with designing the International Linear Collider
 Global digital exemplar, an NHS project to facilitate the transfer of knowledge from digitally advanced trusts to those less advanced
 Glycogen debranching enzyme, a molecule that helps facilitate the breakdown of glycogen
 Gnome desktop environment, GNOME a desktop environment for Linux and most BSD derivatives
 Gas diffusion electrode, electrodes with a conjunction of a solid, liquid and gaseous interface
 Google Developer Expert, a certification by Google

Other uses
 Gauteng Department of Education, South Africa
 Gode Airport (IATA code GDE), Ethiopia 
 Guangdong Enterprises, a former name for Guangdong Holdings
 Gungahlin Drive Extension, a road project in Canberra, Australia
 Gude language (ISO 639-3 code)